Franz Karl Heinrich Wilmanns (27 July 1873 – 23 August 1945) was a Mexican-born German psychiatrist who founded the Heidelberg school of psychopathology. In 1933, Wilmanns was fired from Heidelberg University for political reasons.

References

1873 births
1945 deaths
German psychiatrists